This is a list of largest airlines in Central America and the Caribbean. It is ranked by number of transported passengers.

By passengers carried (millions)

See also
World's largest airlines
List of the busiest airports in South America

Notes
 Includes figures for Air Jamaica.

References 

 Largest
 Largest
Central America
Latin America and the Caribbean